Anton Vasyutinsky (January 17, 1858, Kamianets-Podilskyi - December 2, 1935, Leningrad) - Ukrainian and Russian painter, prominent designer of coins and medals in the Russian Empire and Soviet Union, professor of Imperial Academy of Arts in Saint Petersburg.

References
 (Ukrainian) Кривко Я. Художник-земляк: Сторінки історії // Прапор Жовтня (Кам’янець-Подільський). — 1977. — 23 липня. — С. 4.
 (Ukrainian) Стельмах В., Работинський М. Його медалі відомі в Парижі: До 145-річчя з дня народження Антона Федоровича Васютинського // Кам’янець-Подільський вісник. — 2003. — 24 січня. — С. 9.

Ukrainian painters
Ukrainian male painters
19th-century painters from the Russian Empire
Russian male painters
20th-century Russian painters
Medallists
Coin designers
1858 births
1935 deaths
20th-century sculptors
19th-century sculptors
19th-century male artists from the Russian Empire
20th-century Russian male artists